The 1994 New York Mets season was the 33rd attempt at a regular season for the Mets. They went 55–58 and finished 3rd in the NL East. They were managed by Dallas Green. They played home games at Shea Stadium. The season was cut short by the 1994 player's strike.

Offseason
 October 4, 1993: Ced Landrum was released by the Mets.
 December 10, 1993: Randy Curtis (minors) and a player to be named later were traded by the Mets to the San Diego Padres for Frank Seminara, Tracy Sanders (minors) and a player to be named later. The deal was completed on December 13, with the Mets sending Marc Kroon to the Padres, and the Padres sending Pablo Martínez to the Mets.
 December 16, 1993: Jim Lindeman was signed as a free agent by the Mets.
 December 17, 1993: Doug Linton was signed as a free agent by the Mets.
 January 5, 1994: Vince Coleman and cash were traded by the Mets to the Kansas City Royals for Kevin McReynolds.
 February 18, 1994: Joe Dellicarri (minors) was traded by the Mets to the Detroit Tigers for Kevin Morgan.
 March 30, 1994: Anthony Young and Ottis Smith (minors) were traded by the Mets to the Chicago Cubs for José Vizcaíno.
 March 31, 1994: Alan Zinter was traded by the Mets to the Detroit Tigers for Rico Brogna.

Regular season
By Friday, August 12, the Mets had compiled a 55-58 record through 113 games. They had scored 521 runs (4.48 per game) and allowed 526 runs (4.65 per game).

The Mets struggled in a few offensive areas, finishing 28th in the Majors in both stolen bases (25) and on-base percentage (.316). In spite of these numbers, the Mets had good power, slamming 117 home runs in 113 games, while grounding into just 70 double plays (the fewest in the Majors) and being hit by pitches an MLB-high 52 times.

Jeff Kent's .292 average led the team, as did his 68 RBI. Bobby Bonilla led five Mets with double-digit home run totals with 20. Ryan Thompson added 18, Todd Hundley 16, Kent 14, and David Segui 10.

After two injury-filled and disappointing years, Bret Saberhagen emerged as the ace of the Mets' staff with a 14-4 record. Bobby Jones recorded 12 wins in his first full season in the rotation, and John Franco stayed healthy enough to record 30 saves.

The news was not all positive. After struggling in his first seven starts, Dwight Gooden was suspended for 60 days after a positive test for cocaine. While on suspension he tested positive again and the suspension was extended to the entire 1995 season. Thus, 1994 was his final season as a Met.

Opening Day starters
Jeromy Burnitz
Bobby Jones
Jeff Kent
Kevin McReynolds
David Segui
Kelly Stinnett
Ryan Thompson
Fernando Viña
José Vizcaíno

Season standings

Record vs. opponents

Notable transactions
 April 29, 1994: Roger Mason was purchased by the New York Mets from the Philadelphia Phillies.
 June 14, 1994: Doug Dascenzo was signed as a free agent by the Mets.

Roster

Player stats

Batting

Starters by position 
Note: Pos = Position; G = Games played; AB = At bats; H = Hits; Avg. = Batting average; HR = Home runs; RBI = Runs batted in

Other batters 
Note: G = Games played; AB = At bats; H = Hits; Avg. = Batting average; HR = Home runs; RBI = Runs batted in

Pitching

Starting pitchers 
Note: G = Games pitched; IP = Innings pitched; W = Wins; L = Losses; ERA = Earned run average; SO = Strikeouts

Other pitchers 
Note: G = Games pitched; IP = Innings pitched; W = Wins; L = Losses; ERA = Earned run average; SO = Strikeouts

Relief pitchers 
Note: G = Games pitched; W = Wins; L = Losses; SV = Saves; ERA = Earned run average; SO = Strikeouts

Farm system 

LEAGUE CHAMPIONS: Binghamton

References

External links

1994 New York Mets at Baseball Reference
1994 New York Mets team page at www.baseball-almanac.com

New York Mets seasons
New York Mets season
New York Mets
1990s in Queens